East Branch Tunungwant Creek is a  long fourth-order tributary to Tunungwant Creek.  This is the only stream of this name in the United States.

Course

Watershed

See also 
 List of rivers of Pennsylvania

External Links 
 Dark Skies Fly Fishing (East Branch Tunungwant Creek)
 Pennsylvania Fish and Boat Commission - Report about East Branch Tunungwant Creek (2005)

References

Rivers of Pennsylvania
Tributaries of the Allegheny River
Rivers of McKean County, Pennsylvania